SimSimi is an artificial intelligence conversation program created in 2002 by ISMaker. The application has led to controversy and protests in Thailand for some of its responses containing profanity and criticisms of leading politicians. In April 2018, SimSimi was suspended in Brazil due to accusations of sending inappropriate messages, such as sexual content, bullying practices and even death threats, being labeled as "dangerous" mainly due to its popularity among children, and according to its developer, the suspension of the app in the country "was inevitable because the SimSimi app, at least in the last few days, had a significant negative social impact in Brazil” It grows its artificial intelligence day by day assisted by a feature that allows users to teach it to respond correctly. SimSimi, pronounced as "shim-shimi", is from a Korean word simsim (심심) which means "bored". It has an application designed for Android, for Windows Phone (developed by Kevin Tan) and for iOS.

SimSimi reached some popularity around 2015 when it was featured in a YouTube video by YouTuber Comedy Shorts Gamer, the video reached 4 million views by 2017.

See also 
Chatterbot
Cleverbot
Jabberwacky

References

External links 

Mobile software
Chatbots
Obscenity controversies